Bratton is a village and civil parish in the English county of Wiltshire, about  east of Westbury. The village lies under the northern slope of Salisbury Plain, on the B3098 Westbury – Market Lavington road.

History 

The massive earthworks of the Iron Age hill fort known as Bratton Castle (or Bratton Camp) are within the parish.

Bratton was a tithing of the ancient parish of Westbury until 1894, when it became a separate civil parish.

An agricultural machinery business, R & J Reeves & Son, had a central site in Bratton village which became known as Bratton Iron Works. Begun as a blacksmith in 1799, the company became nationally known in the 19th century and was the largest employer in the area. The firm closed in 1970 and the site is now the village play area.

The Stert and Westbury Railway was built across the parish in 1900. The local station was in the adjacent parish of Edington and was called Edington & Bratton; the station closed to passengers in 1952 and to goods in 1963, but the line remains open as part of the Reading to Taunton Line.

Religious sites 
The Church of England parish church of St James has 14th-century origins and may be on the site of an earlier church. It was rebuilt in the 15th century; the chancel was rebuilt in 1854 by G.G. Scott, with further restoration by T.H. Wyatt in 1860. The church is Grade II* listed.

A Baptist chapel was built in 1734, enlarged in the 1780s and again in the next century, with the addition of a schoolroom. Pevsner describes the chapel as "externally a gem" and it is Grade II* listed. As of 2018 the chapel is still in use.

A Methodist chapel was built in 1870 and closed in 1952; the building was demolished in 1957.

Schools 
A National School was built at Bratton in 1846 and enlarged in 1877. Also around 1846, a British School was established. In 1928 both schools closed and their pupils moved to a newly built Wiltshire County Council school, which became Bratton Primary School and was extended in 1982.

Landmarks
In the village
A commemorative plaque, complete with industrial cog and brick wall, unveiled in 1993 for the R & J Reeves & Sons Iron Works.
A war memorial in the form of a step-based wheel cross.
On Westbury Hill
The Battle of Ethandun Memorial – a large sarsen stone summounting a base of cemented pebbles, unveiled in 2000.
The Queen Elizabeth II golden jubilee beacon placed in 2002.
A topograph dating from 1968, showing towns and cities which can be seen from the hillside.
Westbury White Horse – hill figure
Bratton Castle – Iron Age hillfort

Roughly a mile west of Bratton is a former Lafarge Cement factory, which was reduced to a distribution site in 2009.

Notable buildings 

The Court House (15th and 17th centuries) and Bratton House (1715 and 1826) are Grade II* listed.

Amenities 
The village has a Post Office and village shop, a village hall and a pub, The Duke at Bratton.

Bratton Downs is a biological and geological Site of Special Scientific Interest.

Notable residents
 Maria Grace Saffery (1773–1858), poet and Baptist hymn-writer, lived in Bratton.
 Rebecca Smith (1807–1849), last British woman to be executed for infanticide
 Rev. George Whitaker (1811–1882), clergyman and educator
 Sir Horace Seymour (1885–1978), British diplomat, Ambassador to China
 Major General Sir Jeremy Moore (1928–2007), Commander of British land forces during the Falklands War, lived in the village for over 20 years until his death
 Jack Lauterwasser (1904–2003), cyclist, silver medal winner at the 1928 Olympics, Amsterdam
Marjorie Reeves (1905–2003), historian and educationalist, author of Sheep Bell and Ploughshare: The Story of Two Village Families which describes village life

See also
Battle of Ethandun

References

External links

Bratton village community website

Collection of tools and nameplates donated by R. & J. Reeves and Son Ltd at the Museum of English Rural Life

 
Villages in Wiltshire
Civil parishes in Wiltshire